McKirdy is a surname. Notable people with the surname include:

Arch McKirdy (1924–2013), Australian radio broadcaster
Ed McKirdy, American musician
Harry McKirdy (born 1997), English footballer
Lewis McKirdy, Australian radio announcer
Sean McKirdy (born 1998), Scottish footballer